Bazedoxifene/conjugated estrogens, sold under the brand name Duavee in the US and Duavive in the EU, is a fixed-dose combination medication for the treatment of menopause symptoms and postmenopausal osteoporosis. It contains the selective estrogen receptor modulator bazedoxifene and conjugated estrogens. It is taken by mouth.

The combination was approved for medical use in the United States in October 2013, and in the European Union in December 2014.

See also
 List of combined sex-hormonal preparations

References

External links 
 

Combination drugs
Pfizer brands